Need for Speed: Shift is the thirteenth installment of the racing video game franchise Need for Speed. It was developed by Slightly Mad Studios in conjunction with EA Bright Light and published by Electronic Arts for Microsoft Windows, PlayStation 3, Xbox 360, PlayStation Portable, Android, iOS, Symbian, Windows Mobile, MeeGo and J2ME in 2009.

Shifts gameplay focuses on simulation, rather than the arcade racing of previous titles. Shift was followed by a sequel, Shift 2: Unleashed, in 2011.

As of 2021, Shift is no longer available for purchase in any online stores.

Gameplay

Aimed at a hardcore gamer-style audience, Shift reverts to the touring-car simulation style of its 2007 predecessor, Need for Speed: ProStreet. Although the gameplay of these two titles are similar, Shift recreates car handling much more realistically than its predecessor, and does not contain a story. Upon starting the career mode, the player performs two laps around the Brands Hatch circuit to determine their skill. Once completed, the player is welcomed to the 'NFS Live World Series', and must earn stars in races to earn money, and unlock new races and tiers.

G-force plays an important role in the game, as it affects both the player and the AI. The in-car view also returns, making its first appearance in a Need for Speed game since Porsche Unleashed. The in-car view is highly detailed, and it is possible to see the driver changing gears and moving his head to get a better view of the mirror. The crashes affect the player's visuals. While crashing, there is a temporary blur on screen. The sound aspects have detailed car crash sound, as well as a sharp gasp of breath from the driver before a collision.

There are 60+ cars which are divided into 4 tiers. Tier 1 refers to entry-level sports and luxury cars like the Audi TT and Infiniti G35, tier 2 refers to mid-level performance cars like the BMW M3, tier 3 refers to supercars like the Lamborghini Gallardo, and tier 4 refers to hypercars like the Bugatti Veyron and Pagani Zonda R. The car customisation options include cosmetics as well as performance mods and is more in depth than previous titles, affecting aspects such as alignment, aerodynamics, tyres, brakes, differential, and gears. Nitrous is also an option for tuning, but different from previous Need for Speed titles as it is simulated more realistically. There are body kits which affect the aerodynamics and weight reduction. There are visual customisation options like rims, vinyls and paints.

There are 19 tracks in total including real world circuits such as Brands Hatch, Nürburgring Nordschleife, Road America, Spa, Silverstone, Willow Springs, Donington Park, Autopolis, and Laguna Seca.

The PlayStation Portable version of the game offers local, ad hoc multiplayer, with no online multiplayer support.

Development and release

The game spent two years in development. The game was unveiled as part of a three-game announcement that included Need for Speed: Nitro and Need for Speed: World.

The soundtrack of Shift remains similar to that of Need for Speed: ProStreet, featuring a scored soundtrack rather than a general track list as is seen in previous titles such as Need for Speed: Most Wanted, and Need for Speed: Carbon.

In addition to the standard edition, a "Special Edition" of the game was released exclusive to Europe. The Special Edition features numerous bonuses over the standard edition, including exclusive packaging, a poster of the game, and an unlockable car and race which are redeemable online. Shift was released as a bundle with the PlayStation 3 Slim 250GB to promote the game in Europe.

Patches and downloadable content
EA released patches with new features in addition to bug fixes. Patch 1.01 added LAN (Local Area Network) play and mouse support, providing full menu navigation to the game, to the PC version. Patch 1.02 added 5 cars (Toyota Supra Mk IV, 1971 Dodge Challenger R/T, 1969 Dodge Charger R/T, 1967 Corvette and 1967 Shelby GT-500) and a new online "Team Racing" game mode, where a Blue team of racers runs against a Red Team. In addition, the 1.02 patch fixed several performance issues (especially with ATI video cards), improved gameplay, and increased the maximum number of players online from 8 to 12.

In February 2010, EA released Ferrari DLC pack for Xbox 360 that contains 10 Ferraris, also extends the Shifts career mode with 46 new Ferrari specific challenges designed for the Ferrari cars to participate in including hot laps, eliminators, endurance races and a world tour. Completing the perfect Ferrari package are an additional 125 gamerpoints as a reward for undertaking various challenges. Available on Xbox 360 for 800 Microsoft Points the Ferraris available include the 575 Superamerica, F430 Scuderia Spider 16M, California, 599 GTB Fiorano, F430 Spider, 430 Scuderia, F430 GTC, F430 Challenge, F50 GT & Ferrari FXX. An Exotic Racing Pack was also released for PS3 and Xbox 360 which features cars like the McLaren MP4-12C, the BMW M1, the Gumpert Apollo, the Acura NSX, the Alfa Romeo 8C Competizione, the Maserati GranTurismo S and the Mercedes Benz SLR McLaren Stirling Moss.

Reception

Need for Speed: Shift was met with positive reviews. Aggregating review website Metacritic gave the PlayStation 3 version 84/100, the Xbox 360 version 83/100, the PC version 83/100, and the PlayStation Portable version 69/100.

IGN awarded it 9 out of 10 citing among other things an incredible driving experience and excellent sound effects. IGN also gave it an Editors' Choice award. Official Xbox Magazine awarded Shift with 9/10 saying that it has an outstanding driver's view; a deep, addictive career mode with much variety and many options; sharp multiplayer racing counts toward single-player career. Official Xbox Magazine has also nominated it for editors choice award. Eurogamer gave it a 7/10, also noting that it could be a good competitor to other simulation racing games such as Gran Turismo and Forza Motorsport.

Need for Speed: Shift sold 309,000 units in the United States in September 2009.

References

External links
 
 
 

2009 video games
Electronic Arts games
IOS games
 13
PlayStation 3 games
PlayStation Portable games
Racing simulators
Slightly Mad Studios games
Sports video games with career mode
Video games developed in the United Kingdom
Video games scored by Mark Morgan
Video games scored by Mick Gordon
Video games scored by Stephen Baysted
Video games set in Belgium
Video games set in California
Video games set in England
Sports video games set in Germany
Video games set in Japan
Video games set in Tokyo
Video games set in London
Video games set in Wisconsin
Racing video games set in the United States
Video games with alternative versions
Windows games
Xbox 360 games
Android (operating system) games
Windows Mobile games
Multiplayer and single-player video games
Simulation video games
J2ME games